Gabrielle Rose may refer to:

 Gabrielle Rose (swimmer) (born 1977), American swimmer
 Gabrielle Rose (actress) (born 1954), Canadian actress